Band-Maid is a Japanese rock band formed in 2013, consisting of singer Saiki Atsumi, guitarist/singer Miku Kobato, lead guitarist Kanami Tōno, bassist Misa, and drummer Akane Hirose. The band combines a rock sound with a maid image modeled on Japanese maid cafés. They are currently signed to Pony Canyon, and their most recent full-length album Unseen World was released in 2021.

History

Early years 

The band formed in July 2013. Guitarist/singer Miku Kobato, formerly an employee of a Japanese maid café, envisioned forming a band that juxtaposed the maid image with rock music. Kobato recruited lead guitarist Kanami Tōno after an Internet search. Tōno had performed as a singer-songwriter and suggested her occasional backing drummer Akane Hirose for the new band. Hirose in turn suggested bassist Misa, with whom she had attended music school. On July 24, 2013, they had their first live performance as a quartet with Kobato on vocals at the PP Audition held at Osaka Deep. The band then decided to recruit an additional lead singer and selected Saiki Atsumi during auditions. Their first performance as a five-piece was at the P Festival at Shibuya-AX on August 22, 2013. The band signed to Gump Records (an imprint of the Platinum Passport artist management and talent agency) that year.

Early in their history, Band-Maid regularly performed live at various venues around the Tokyo area. The group released their debut mini-album Maid in Japan in January 2014, written in collaboration with musicians Masahiko Fukui and Kentaro Akutsu. In August 2014, they released the maxi-single "Ai to Jōnetsu no Matador" (titled "Love, Passion, Matador" internationally).

In November 2015 they released their sophomore mini-album New Beginning. The mini-album was their first chart placement, reaching No. 64 on the Japanese Oricon weekly albums chart. The band undertook a tour of Tokyo venues to promote the album through February 2016, culminating in a sold-out concert on February 14.

International recognition 
Band-Maid first gained international notice in April 2015 when the English-language Facebook page of internet radio station Jrock Radio promoted the music video for "Thrill", which led to over 1 million views in the following year. In March 2016 they had their first overseas performance at Sakura-Con in Seattle, Washington.

The group released their third mini-album and major label debut, Brand New Maid, in May 2016 on the Nippon Crown sub-label Crown Stones, followed by a JPU Records release in Europe in July. The album reached No. 19 on the Japanese Oricon weekly albums chart. In October and November 2016, they went on their first world tour that took them to Mexico, Hong Kong, and several countries in Europe.

In January 2017, Band-Maid released their first full-length album titled Just Bring It. It was preceded by the single "YOLO", released in November 2016. Just Bring It reached No. 16 on the Japanese Oricon weekly albums chart. Band-Maid appeared at the 2017 Golden Melody Awards and festival in Taiwan on June 23–24. The maxi-single "Daydreaming/Choose Me" was released in July 2017. They covered "Honey" for the November 2017 Mucc tribute album Tribute of Mucc -En-.

The band released their second full-length album titled World Domination in February 2018, which reached no. 9 on the Japanese Oricon weekly albums chart. On the same day, they reissued their 2014 debut album Maid in Japan with two bonus tracks. While the original release of that album did not chart, the reissued version reached No. 26 on the Japanese Oricon weekly albums chart. On April 1, 2018, they performed at Warped Tour at Makuhari Messe as the first date of a world tour.

The maxi-single "Start Over" was released in July 2018.

2019–present 

The CD singles "Glory" and "Bubble" were released simultaneously in January 2019. "Glory" serves as the second ending theme for the second season of the Japanese anime series Yu-Gi-Oh! VRAINS, while "Bubble" serves as the theme song for the Japanese drama series Perfect Crime. Later in 2019, the band signed a new deal with Revolver Records. Under the name Band-Maiko and adopting a maiko image, the band released an EP titled Band-Maiko in April 2019, which adapted several previous Band-Maid songs with traditional Japanese musical instruments and lyrics in the Kyoto dialect. In April 2019, the band announced a tour of the United Kingdom, France, Germany, Taiwan, and the United States in partnership with Live Nation Entertainment.

The band's third full-length album Conqueror was released in December 2019. The album featured one song produced by Tony Visconti. It debuted at no. 9 on Japanese Oricon weekly albums chart and debuted at no. 1 on the Oricon weekly Rock Albums chart.

They released their first standalone concert video Band-Maid World Domination Tour [Shinka] at Line Cube Shibuya (Shibuya Public Hall) in April 2020. In late 2020, the band left Revolver Records and signed with Pony Canyon. The non-album single "Different" was released in December 2020; the song also serves as the opening theme for the Japanese anime series Log Horizon: Destruction of the Round Table. The band's fourth full-length album, Unseen World, was released in January 2021. It debuted at no. 8 on Japanese Oricon weekly albums chart and at no. 1 on the Oricon weekly Rock Albums chart. Guitarist/singer Miku Kobato, under the name Cluppo, released the solo single "Peace & Love" in April and the double single "Peace & Love/Flapping Wings" in August of the same year.

Band-Maid made a cameo appearance in the 2021 Netflix film Kate, playing themselves in a concert scene. Their songs "Blooming" and "Choose Me" were used in the film. The single "Sense" was released in October 2021; the song also serves as the opening theme for the Japanese anime series Platinum End. In December 2021, they announced a second US tour, including an appearance at Aftershock Festival, which took place in late 2022. "Choose Me" was used in the US TV series Peacemaker. In March 2022 Kobato, again under the name Cluppo, released the EP Hatofull. In July 2022 Kobato released the non-album Cluppo single "With You", which serves as the ending theme for the Japanese anime series Smile of the Arsnotoria. Band-Maid released an EP titled Unleash on September 21, 2022. Band-Maid opened for Guns N' Roses 2020 Tour on November 6.

In early January 2023, the band announced a 10th anniversary tour, planned to begin in March in Japan, with U.S. shows in May and August, and culminating with a show at Yokohama Arena in November 2023. The band appeared as the opening act for The Last Rockstars on their American tour dates in February 2023.

Image and music

Band-Maid's image is modeled on maid café hostesses, with the standard uniform adapted to match each member's personality. In interviews, they explained the concept came from founding member Miku Kobato who had previously worked at a maid café in Akihabara. This theme is reinforced by the band, who refer to their male fans as "masters", their female fans as "princesses", and their concerts as "servings." The band's "cute and submissive" maid appearance is meant to contrast with their aggressive rock style. They decided to have two vocalists to allow a larger variety of music with two different voice types.

The ''servings" are usually interrupted by a pause where the members present some comedic interaction with the audience. This is called Omajinai-Time and mainly performed by Kobato. She gives her voice a high pitch to appear extra cute (kawaii). This performance includes calls and responses of ''moe moe kyun'' which comes from anime movies and maid cafés to show cuteness.

Kobato loved Japanese enka music when she was a child, and Tokyo Jihen led her to rock. She attended a vocal school around 2012, but started playing guitar with the formation of Band-Maid the following year. Atsumi started singing when she was 14 and Band-Maid is her first band. Tōno is a big fan of Carlos Santana, has played classical piano since she was a child, and began playing guitar when she joined her high school band club. Hirose is a fan of Deep Purple and Maximum the Hormone, particularly the latter's female drummer Nao Kawakita, and also played trombone and piano. Misa likes Paz Lenchantin, The Smashing Pumpkins, and Jimi Hendrix; she started playing piano at around 3 or 4 years of age, and also played trumpet, alto horn, and guitar.

Band members 
  – rhythm guitar, vocals (2013–present)
  – lead guitar (2013–present)
  – drums (2013–present)
 Misa – bass (2013–present)
  – lead vocals (2013–present)

Discography 

Studio albums
Maid in Japan (2014)
New Beginning (2015)
Brand New Maid (2016)
Just Bring It (2017)
World Domination (2018)
Conqueror (2019)
Unseen World (2021)

Awards and nominations

See also
List of J-pop concerts held outside Asia

References

External links 

 Official website
 Official page at JPU Records 
 
 

Japanese hard rock musical groups
Japanese heavy metal musical groups
All-female bands
Musical groups established in 2013
2013 establishments in Japan
Musical quintets
Pony Canyon artists